Purushottam Agrawal (born on 25 August 1955) is an Indian writer and an ex-member of the Union Public Service Commission board.

Early life and career 
He was born in the city of Gwalior, Madhya Pradesh, on 25 August 1955. He did his M.A. in Political Science from Jiwaji University (Gwalior) in 1977 and then moved to Delhi where he got an M.A. in Hindi literature at Jawaharlal Nehru University. He was awarded a Ph.D. degree by Jawaharlal Nehru University in 1985 on the topic of The Social Meaning of Kabir's Bhakti under the supervision of Prof. Namvar Singh.

Between 2 July 2007 – July 2013, he was a member of the Union Public Service Commission, New Delhi.

He was the anchor and interviewer on  the TV show 'Kitab', telecast on Rajya Sabha TV (now Sansad TV).

Bibliography 
1.Teesara Rukh

2. Shivdan Singh Chauhan

3. Sanskriti: Varchsva aur Pratirodh

4. Nij Brahma Vichar: Dharma, Samaj aur Dharmetar Adhyatma

5. Vichar ka Ananta

6. Akath Kahani Prem Ki : Kabir ki Kavita aur Unka Samay

7. Hindi Saray: Astrakhan via Yerevan

8. Scholaris ki Chhanv Men

9. Nacohus

References

External links 
 
 

1955 births
Living people
Indian television presenters
Jawaharlal Nehru University alumni